Dennis Sheldon Norfleet (born February 8, 1993) is an American football player.

High school career
Norfleet played high school football  Detroit's Martin Luther King High School. As a senior in 2011, he rushed for 2,033 yards and 27 touchdowns.  As a junior, he rushed for 254 yards against regional football power Brother Rice in the 2010 season opener. A versatile player, he played at running back, slot receiver, defensive back, kick returner, punter and place kicker in high school.  Detroit King head coach Dale Harvel said of Norfleet, "What can I say? He does everything for us. He plays wherever we need him.  Call him Jim Thorpe."

In August 2011, the Detroit Free Press named Norfleet as the most exciting player in Michigan high school football, calling him "lightning quick and more powerful than many think."  Tom Markowski of The Detroit News added, "Pound for pound, if he's not the state's best football player, he's the most exciting."

Norfleet was a three-sport star at Detroit King, also playing as a guard on the basketball team and running as a sprinter on the track team. He captured the state title in the 100-meter dash event at the 2010 State Class 2-A Meet, recording a personal-best time of 10.60 seconds.

University of Michigan
Norfleet initially committed in August 2011 to play for the University of Cincinnati Bearcats, but he switched his commitment on February 1, 2012, after receiving a late offer from Michigan.

Dennis Norfleet became a member of Omega Psi Phi fraternity, Phi chapter  in April 2014. During the game against Penn State in October 2014, Norfleet set the media abuzz when he performed a series of HOPS in name of his Fraternity, while "Atomic Dog" was playing in the background.

Dennis was kicked off the team prior to the 2015 season and transferred to Division II Tuskegee.

2012 season
As a true freshman, Norfleet became Michigan's kickoff return specialist. In his first game for Michigan, Norfleet led the Wolverines with 177 all-purpose yards, including a 33-yard kickoff return, against Alabama.  After the loss to Alabama, Michael Rothstein of ESPN.com wrote: "About the only positive for Michigan in the first half was the play of freshman kick returner Dennis Norfleet, who showed good instincts and speed."

On November 10, 2012, Norfleet passed Steve Breaston to move into second place in Michigan's record book in both number of kickoff returns in a season and kickoff return yards in a season.  He trails only Darryl Stonum in Michigan's record book; Stonum returned 39 kickoffs for 1,001 yards for the 2009 team.  Through the first 11 games of the 2012 season, Norfleet had returned 33 kickoffs for 768 yards, an average of 23.5 yards per return.

Norfleet also returned two punts for 53 yards, including a 42-yard return against Illinois, for an average of 26.5 yards per return.  His 43-yard punt return against Illinois nearly resulted in a touchdown, but Norfleet ran into the punter and fell before scoring.  He has seen little action as a running back as a freshman.  In his first carry as a running back, Norfleet ran for 14 yards against UMass on September 15, 2012.

Professional career
In the spring of 2016, Norfleet participated in Michigan's Pro Day.

Norfleet signed with the CFL's Saskatchewan Roughriders on April 26, 2017 and was released shortly thereafter on May 1, 2017.

References

1993 births
Living people
Michigan Wolverines football players
Players of American football from Detroit
Martin Luther King High School (Detroit) alumni
Saskatchewan Roughriders players